The Reparation Commission was established by the Treaty of Versailles to determine the level of reparations which the defeated central powers should pay the victorious Allies after the First World War. Although there was representation from France , Belgium and Britain there was no official representative from the United States. The Reparation Commission was disbanded in 1930, following the adoption of the Young Plan that essentially brought the payment of reparations by the German government to an end.

Arthur Salter was appointed Secretary General to the commission.

References

International commissions
Organizations established in 1919
Organizations disestablished in 1930